Verónica Schneider Rodríguez (born 16 December 1978, in Caracas, Venezuela) is a model and actress.

Biography
Schneider was born in Caracas, Venezuela to María Elisa (sociologist) and Pablo Schneider (musician). As Miss Monagas 1997, she competed in the Miss Venezuela 1998 pageant and was Miss World Venezuela 1998. In November of that year, she went to the Seychelles to compete in the Miss World 1998 pageant, where she did not make it to the semi-finals.  She also studied Computer Science at Universidad Central de Venezuela.

In 2002, Schneider turned to television and signed with Venevision. The first role she got was in the telenovela Mambo y Canela where she played the part of Wanda. In 2003, she was cast in the role of Marisela Ruiz Montero in the telenovela Enganada. In 2004, she went to Peru to play villain Fernanda Velacochea in the telenovela Besos Robados. In 2005, she signed with RCTV and played the role of Erika Hoffman in Amantes an early 20th-century production. In 2011 Schneider appeared in the telenovela La Viuda Joven, produced by Venevision. In 2012 she starred in La ratonera  by Agatha Christie.

Personal life
She is married to the model Enrique Palacios and has two children Sarah and David.

Filmography 
 2019 Betty en NY
 2011 La viuda joven
 2006 Y los declaro marido y mujer
 2005 Amantes
 2004 Besos robados
 2003 Engañada
 2002 Mambo y canela

References

External links
 
 monarcasdevenezuelaymundiales (Name)

Miss World 1998 delegates
Miss Venezuela World winners
Venezuelan telenovela actresses
Venezuelan female models
Venezuelan Jews
Venezuelan people of German-Jewish descent
People from Caracas
Living people
1978 births
Central University of Venezuela alumni
Jewish female models